The 2014–15 Eurocup Basketball knockout stage is the last phase in the competition. Eight-finals started on March 3 and the Finals were played on April 24 and 29.

All times are CET (UTC+1).

Round of 16
The eight-finals were two-legged ties determined on aggregate score. The first legs were played on March 2–3 and return legs were played on March 9–10. The group winner in each tie, listed as "Team #1", hosted the second leg.

Game 1

Game 2

Quarterfinals
The eight-finals were two-legged ties determined on aggregate score. The first legs were played on March 17–18 and return legs were played on March 24–25. "Team #1" hosted the second leg.

Game 1

Game 2

Semifinals

Game 1

Game 2

Finals

Game 1

Game 2

References

2014–15 Eurocup Basketball